Bradford-on-Avon Tithe Barn is a Grade I listed barn in Pound Lane, Bradford on Avon, Wiltshire, England. It was part of a medieval grange belonging to Shaftesbury Abbey and was built in the early 14th century, with a granary dated to about 1400.  It is owned and protected by English Heritage and managed by the Bradford on Avon Preservation Trust.

Geography
The tithe barn is at Barton Farm on the southern side of Bradford-on Avon in West Wiltshire, to the southeast of Bath. The Kennet and Avon Canal passes close to the south side of the barn.

History
An early barn, of which no remains survive today, was built on the site of the current barn around 1300. The current Tithe Barn dates to the 1330s, probably c.1332. It was definitely built before 1367. It originally belonged to the nuns of the nearby Shaftesbury Abbey in Dorset, the richest nunnery in England. It was used for storage of tithes during the Middle Ages. The Abbey was entitled to 10% of the produce of its tenants.

When Shaftesbury Abbey was dissolved in 1539, the grange became a farm.  By 1914 the building was superfluous to the farm's requirements and, rather than demolish it, the then owner, Sir Charles Hobhouse, donated the barn to the Wiltshire Archaeological Society. The farm continued in use until purchased by Wiltshire County Council in 1971, with the barn in use until 1974. The barn was designated a scheduled monument in 1930 and as a Grade I listed building in 1952.

By the 1980s the weight of the roof was pushing the walls out, necessitating the underpinning of the walls and the installation of iron cross-ties to stop the movement.

Features

There are two large porches on the northern side to allow entry for loaded carts. Opposite them are smaller porches to allow the empty carts to leave. The apertures high above the doors, which still contain some original wood, are left unglazed to allow owls to enter in search of vermin.

An attraction for visitors is the barn's interior, with its timber cruck roof spanning 14 bays divided by A-shaped trusses supporting 100 tons of stone tiles.

Popular culture
In the 1980s, the barn was a filming location for the cult TV series Robin of Sherwood, doubling as Nottingham Castle's great hall.

References

Bibliography

Buildings and structures completed in the 14th century
Barns in England
Buildings and structures in Wiltshire
Grade I listed buildings in Wiltshire
Bradford-on-Avon
Tithe barns in Europe

External links

 Bradford-on-Avon Preservation Trust